The  (formerly Diplomatic Record Office of the Ministry of Foreign Affairs) in Tokyo, Japan, is the office of the Ministry of Foreign Affairs in charge of archiving Japan's diplomatic documents. 

An exhibition hall near the archives building (別館展示室) can be visited freely, in which exhibits are regularly held.

See also
 List of museums in Tokyo

Notes

External links
 Diplomatic Archives - information in English
 Museum site - in Japanese

Museums in Tokyo
History museums in Japan
Diplomacy